Leash law may refer to:

Leash Law, an American power metal band
Leash law, a law requiring dogs or other pets to be kept on a leash while in public